The Römische Kaisermedaillon is an award presented by the city of Mainz.

The award is presented at irregular intervals to persons who have rendered outstanding services to the study of the cultural history of the city of Mainz.

Holders of the Römischen Kaisermedaillons 
 1970: Marie Böckel-Grosch
 1976: Paul Walter Jacob
 1980: Heinz Gehrmann
 1982: Jürgen Jughard
 1987: Werner Hanfgarn
 1994: Fritz Diehl
 2000: Helmut Mathy
 2006: Friedrich Schütz
 2007: Fee Fleck
 2008: Franz Dumont
 2011: Hans-Jürgen Kotzur
 2015: Hedwig Brüchert

References 

German awards
Mainz